Taraji P. Henson is an American actress who has received various awards and nominations, including one Golden Globe Award, one Critics' Choice Movie Award, and a Screen Actors Guild Award. Additionally, she has been nominated for one Academy Award, three Primetime Emmy Awards, and five Screen Actors Guild Awards. In 2019, Henson received a star on the Hollywood Walk of Fame for her contributions to the motion picture industry.

In 2005 she was in Hustle & Flow's cast, which gave her first Screen Actors Guild Award nomination. Henson's breakthrough role in the 2008 acclaimed romantic drama film The Curious Case of Benjamin Button earned her an Academy Award nomination for Best Supporting Actress.

She gained wider recognition for her role as Cookie Lyon on the Fox television series Empire (2009–2015), which earned her a Golden Globe and a Critics' Choice Television Award for Best Actress in a Drama Series, becoming the first African-American actress to do so. The television series also garnered her two Primetime Emmy Award nominations in the same category. In 2016, she starred as NASA mathematician Katherine Johnson in the biographical drama Hidden Figures, which won her a MTV Movie Award for Best Hero and a NAACP Image Award for Outstanding Actress. Henson and her co-stars were selected as the Best Cast from the National Board of Review and won Best Cast from the Screen Actors Guild and Satellite Awards.

Major associations

Academy Awards

|- 
| 
| 
| Best Supporting Actress
| 
| 
|}

Golden Globe Awards

|-
| 
| Empire
| Best Actress – Television Series Drama
| 
| 
|}

Primetime Emmy Awards

|-
| 
| Taken from Me: The Tiffany Rubin Story
| Outstanding Lead Actress in a Limited Series or Movie 
| 
| 
|-
| 
| rowspan=2 | Empire
| rowspan=2 | Outstanding Lead Actress in a Drama Series
| 
| 
|-
| 
| 
| 
|}

Screen Actors Guild Awards

|-
| 2006
| Outstanding Performance by a Cast in a Motion Picture 
| Hustle & Flow
| 
| 
|-
| 2008
| rowspan=2 | Outstanding Performance by an Ensemble in a Drama Series 
| rowspan=2 | Boston Legal
| 
| 
|-
| rowspan="3"| 2009
| 
| rowspan="3"| 
|-
| Outstanding Performance by a Female Actor in a Supporting Role
| rowspan=2 | 
| 
|-
| rowspan="2" | Outstanding Performance by a Cast in a Motion Picture
| 
|-
| 2017
| Hidden Figures
| 
| 
|}

Other associations

Black Reel Award 

|-
|  2002
| Baby Boy
| Best Actress
| 
|-
| rowspan="2"| 2006
| Hustle & Flow
|rowspan="2"| Best Ensemble
| 
|-
| Four Brothers
| 
|-
|  2009
| 
| Best Supporting Actress
| 
|-
| 2010
| I Can Do Bad All By Myself
| Best Actress
| 
|-
| 
| Taken from Me: The Tiffany Rubin Story
| Outstanding Actress, TV Movie or Limited Series
| 
|-
| 
| Hidden Figures
| Best Actress
| 
| 
|-
| 
| Ralph Breaks the Internet
| Outstanding Voice Performance
| 
| 
|-
|}

Black Reel Award for Television 

|-
|  2017
|rowspan=2| Empire
|rowspan=2| Outstanding Actress, Drama Series
| 
|-
| 2018
| 
|}

BET Awards 

|-
| 2006
| Hustle & Flow
| rowspan="11"| Best Actress
| 
|-
| 2009
|The Curious Case of Benjamin Button
| 
|-
| 2010
|I Can Do Bad All by Myself
| 
|-
| 2011
|Taken from Me: The Tiffany Rubin Story and The Karate Kid
| 
|-
| 2012
|Person of Interest 
| 
|-
| 2013
|Person of Interest and Think Like a Man
| 
|-
| 2015
| rowspan="2"| Empire
| 
|-
| 2016
| 
|-
| 2017
|Hidden Figures
| 
|-
| 2018
|Proud Mary and Acrimony
| 
|-
| 2019
|Empire
| 
|}

Critics' Choice Movie Awards

|-
| rowspan="2" | 
| rowspan="2" |
| Best Supporting Actress
| 
| rowspan="2" | 
|-
| rowspan="2" | Best Acting Ensemble
| 
|-
| 
| Hidden Figures
| 
| 
|}

Critics' Choice Television Awards

|-
| 
| rowspan="2" | Empire
| rowspan="2" | Best Actress in a Drama Series
| 
| 
|- 
| 
| 
| 
|}

NAACP Image Awards 

|-
| 2006
| Hustle & Flow
| Outstanding Supporting Actress in a Motion Picture
| 
|-
| 2008
| Talk to Me (2007 film)
| Outstanding Actress in a Motion Picture
| 
|-
| 2009
| The Curious Case of Benjamin Button (film)
| Outstanding Supporting Actress in a Motion Picture
| 
|-
|2010
|I Can Do Bad All by Myself (film)
| Outstanding Actress in a Motion Picture
| 
|
|-
| rowspan="2"| 2012
| Taken from Me: The Tiffany Rubin Story
| Outstanding Actress in a Television Movie, Mini-Series or Dramatic Special
| 
|-
| Person of Interest
| Outstanding Actress in a Drama Series
| 
|-
| 2013
| Think Like a Man
| Outstanding Supporting Actress in a Motion Picture
| 
|-
| 2014
| Person of Interest
| Outstanding Supporting Actress in a Drama Series
| 
|-
| rowspan="2"| 2015
| 
| Entertainer of the Year
| 
|-
| No Good Deed
| Outstanding Actress in a Motion Picture
| 
|-
| 2016
| Empire
| Outstanding Actress in a Drama Series
| 
|-
| rowspan="3"| 2017
| Hidden Figures
| Outstanding Actress in a Motion Picture
| 
|-
| Around The Way Girl: A Memoir
| Outstanding Literary Work Biography/Autobiography
| 
|-
| rowspan="3"| Empire
| rowspan="3"| Outstanding Actress in a Drama Series
| 
|-
| 2018
| 
|-
| 2019
| 
|-
| 2022
| Annie Live!
| Outstanding Actress in a Television Movie, Limited-Series or Dramatic Special
| 
|-
| rowspan="4"| 2023
| Minions: The Rise of Gru
| Outstanding Character Voice-Over Performance - Motion Picture
| 
|-
| BET Awards 2022
| Outstanding Host in a Reality, Game Show or Variety (Series or Special)
| 
|}

Nickelodeon Kids' Choice Awards

|-
| 
| Minions: The Rise of Gru
| Favorite Voice from an Animated Movie (Female)
| 
| 
|}

Palm Springs International Film Festival

|-
| 
| Hidden Figures
| Ensemble Performance Award
| 
| 
|-
|}

People's Choice Awards

|-
| 
| rowspan="2" | Empire
| rowspan="2" | Favorite Dramatic TV Actress
| 
| 
|- 
| 
| 
| 
|}

Satellite Awards

|-
| 
| Talk to Me
| Best Supporting Actress in a Motion Picture 
| 
| 
|-
| 
| Taken from Me: The Tiffany Rubin Story
| Best Actress in a Miniseries or TV Film 
| 
| 
|-
| 
| Empire
| Best Actress in a Drama Series 
| 
| 
|-
| rowspan=2 | 
| rowspan=2 | Hidden Figures
| Best Actress in a Motion Picture 
| 
| rowspan=2 | 
|-
| Best Cast – Motion Picture
| 
|}

Saturn Awards

|-
| 
| Hidden Figures
| Best Actress 
| 
| 
|-
|}

Teen Choice Awards

|-
| rowspan="2" | 2015
| Choice TV: Actress Drama 
| rowspan="3" | Empire
| 
| rowspan="2" | 
|-
| Choice TV: Chemistry
| 
|- 
| 2016
| Choice TV: Actress Drama 
| 
| 
|- 
| 2017
| Choice Movie Actress: Drama
| Hidden Figures
| 
| 
|- 
|}

Critics awards

Notes

References

Henson, Taraji